Pythium splendens is a plant pathogen. It is a potentially useful organism for the synthesis of large amounts of eicosapentaenoic acid, which is a polyunsaturated fatty acid with a variety of functions that are beneficial to biological systems.

References

Further reading

External links
 Index Fungorum
 USDA ARS Fungal Database

Water mould plant pathogens and diseases
splendens